Norman Rush (born October 24, 1933) is an American writer most of whose introspective novels and short stories are set in Botswana in the 1980s.
He won the U.S. National Book Award and the 1992 Irish Times/Aer Lingus International Fiction Prize for his novel Mating.

Life and career 

Rush was born in San Francisco and raised in Oakland, the son of Roger and Leslie (Chesse) Rush. He graduated from Swarthmore College in 1956. During the Korean War he was sentenced to two years incarceration for his status as a conscientious objector to the war, but was released on parole after nine months. After working for fifteen years as a book dealer, he changed careers to become a teacher and found he had more time to write. He submitted a short story about his teaching experiences to The New Yorker, which was published in 1978.

Rush and his wife Elsa were co-directors of the Peace Corps in Botswana from 1978 to 1983, which provided material for his short story collection Whites (1986). Whites was a finalist for the 1987 Pulitzer Prize for Fiction. His Botswana experience also served as the setting for his novels Mating (1991) and Mortals (2003).

Rush lives with his wife, Elsa, in Rockland County, New York, in a farmhouse which they have shared since 1961 located on High Tor Mountain.

Rush's third novel, Subtle Bodies, was published in September 2013.

Published works 
 Whites, short stories Alfred A. Knopf, 1986,  —  finalist for the  Pulitzer Prize for Fiction
 Mating, Knopf, 1991,  — winner of the National Book Award for Fiction
 Mortals, a novel Knopf, 2003, .
 Subtle Bodies, a novel, Knopf, 2013, .

References

External links 
 
 Keillor, Garrison. Writer's Almanac. October 24, 2006.
 The Bat Segundo Show (70 minute radio interview). September 3, 2013.

1933 births
20th-century American novelists
21st-century American novelists
American male novelists
National Book Award winners
Living people
Swarthmore College alumni
Writers from California
American male short story writers
20th-century American short story writers
21st-century American short story writers
20th-century American male writers
21st-century American male writers